Alan George Ernest Ealham (born 8 August 1944) is a former English professional cricketer who played for Kent County Cricket Club. He was born at Willesborough in Kent in 1944.

Ealham made his first-class cricket debut in 1966 after serving an apprenticeship as a welder. He won his county cap in 1970 and captained the club between 1978 and 1980. As captain he led the county to victory in the County Championship and the Benson and Hedges Cup in 1978. He was an outstanding fielder and was 12th man for the England cricket team on a number of occasions, taking two catches in the Ashes Test match against Australia at Lord's at the start of the 1977 series. After playing he retained his links with Kent and was Second XI coach for a number of years.

He is the father of Mark Ealham who also played cricket for Kent and England, and who was also a County Championship winner (with Nottinghamshire).

References

External links

1944 births
Living people
English cricketers
Kent cricketers
Kent cricket captains
People from Willesborough